The 5th British Independent Film Awards, held on October 30, 2002 at the Pacha Nightclub in Victoria, London honoured the best British independent films of 2002.

Awards

Best Actor
James Nesbitt - Bloody Sunday
Bill Nighy - Lawless Heart
Richard Harris - My Kingdom
Timothy Spall - All or Nothing

Best Actress
Samantha Morton - Morvern Callar
Elaine Cassidy - Disco Pigs
Harriet Walter - Villa des Roses
Shirley Henderson - Villa des Roses

Best Director
Paul Greengrass - Bloody Sunday
Ken Loach - Sweet Sixteen
Lynne Ramsay - Morvern Callar
Neil Hunter - Lawless Heart
Tom Hunsinger - Lawless Heart

Best Screenplay
Tom Hunsinger - Lawless Heart
Neil Hunter - Lawless Heart
Lynne Ramsay - Morvern Callar
Liana Dognini - Morvern Callar
Paul Greengrass - Bloody Sunday
Paul Laverty - Sweet Sixteen

Best Technical Achievement
Alwin H. Küchler - Morvern Callar
Ivan Strasburg - Bloody Sunday
Mark Tildesley - Twenty Four Hour Party People
Scott Thomas - Lawless Heart

Best Achievement in Production
24 Hour Party People
Villa des Roses
Revengers Tragedy
Morvern Callar

Most Promising Newcomer
Martin Compston - Sweet Sixteen
Kathleen McDermott - Morvern Callar
Parminder Nagra - Bend It Like Beckham
William Ruane - Sweet Sixteen

Douglas Hickox Award
Lindy Heymann - Showboy
Christian Taylor - Showboy
Kirsten Sheridan - Disco Pigs
Paul Sarossy - Mr In-Between
Duncan Roy - AKA

Best Foreign Film - Foreign Language
Monsoon Wedding
Y Tu Mamá También
Talk to Her
Nine Queens

Best Foreign Film - English Language
Lantana
Ivans Xtc
Lost in La Mancha
Ghost World

Best British Film
Sweet Sixteen
Bend It Like Beckham
Morvern Callar
Bloody Sunday
Lawless Heart

Outstanding Contribution by an Actor
Richard Harris

Most Effective Distribution Campaign
Christie Malry's Own Double-Entry

Variety Award
Ewan McGregor

Lifetime Achievement Award
George Harrison

References

External links
BIFA homepage

British Independent Film Awards
2002 film awards
Independent Film Awards
2002 in London
October 2002 events in the United Kingdom
2000s in the City of Westminster